Downs Chapel is an unincorporated community in Kent County, Delaware, United States. Downs Chapel is located at the intersection of Delaware Route 300 and Downs Chapel Road, west of Kenton.

History
Downs Chapel's population was 30 in 1890, 34 in 1900, and 20 in 1960.

References

Unincorporated communities in Kent County, Delaware
Unincorporated communities in Delaware